Battlecry Under A Wintersun is the debut studio album by Canadian power metal band 3 Inches of Blood. It was released in 2002 by Megarock Records. It is the last release by the band to feature original bassist Rich Trawick and drummer Geoff Trawick. The album peaked at number 18 on the Canadian national college charts and at number 2 on the national loud charts. The album was re-released in 2009 on Minion Records, marking the first time it was made available in the U.S. The reissue also includes 4 bonus tracks, taken from the "Sect of the White Worm" EP.

Track listing

Personnel
 Cam Pipes – clean vocals
 Jamie Hooper – screaming vocals
 Sunny Dhak – lead guitar
 Bobby Froese – rhythm guitar
 Rich Trawick – bass
 Geoff Trawick – drums
 Jesse Gander – producer

References

External links
Tartarean Desire - Three Inches of Blood

2002 debut albums
3 Inches of Blood albums
Megarock Records albums